Devin Marquese Bush Sr. (born July 3, 1973) is an American former college and professional football player who was a safety in the National Football League (NFL) for eight seasons during the 1990s and early 2000s. Bush played college football for Florida State University (FSU), where he was a member of FSU's 1993 national championship team.  He was drafted by the Atlanta Falcons in the first round of the 1995 NFL Draft, and he also played professionally for the NFL's St. Louis Rams and Cleveland Browns.

Early life
Bush was born in Miami, Florida.  He attended Hialeah-Miami Lakes High School in Hialeah, Florida, where he was a standout high school football player for the Hialeah-Miami Lakes Trojans.

College football career
Bush received an athletic scholarship to attend Florida State University, where he played for coach Bobby Bowden's Florida State Seminoles football team from 1992 to 1994.  As a sophomore in 1993, Bush was a starting safety for the Seminoles' Bowl Coalition national championship team that defeated the Nebraska Cornhuskers 18–16 in the Orange Bowl.  During his three-year college career as a Seminole, the team won three consecutive Atlantic Coast Conference (ACC) championships, and Bush received All-ACC honors in 1993 and 1994.  His defensive coordinator at Florida State, Mickey Andrews, later said Bush "was the most complete player he had ever coached."

Professional football career

The Atlanta Falcons chose Bush in the first round, with the 26th overall pick, of the 1995 NFL Draft. Between 1995 and 2002, he played at both safety spots in his career for the Atlanta Falcons, St. Louis Rams and Cleveland Browns.  He appeared in two Super Bowls: the Falcons' loss to the Denver Broncos in Super Bowl XXXIII at the end of the 1998–99 season, and the St. Louis Rams' 23–16 win over the Tennessee Titans in Super Bowl XXXIV in 1999–2000.  Bush had seven career interceptions, two of which he returned for touchdowns.

Coaching career
In April 2013, he became a football coach at Charles W. Flanagan High School in Pembroke Pines, Florida.

On February 18, 2016, Bush became a defensive analyst for the University of Michigan under head coach Jim Harbaugh, joining his son, Devin Bush Jr., who was part of Michigan's 2016 recruiting class, in Ann Arbor.

On February 7, 2020, Ole Miss announced that Bush joined their staff as their director of recruiting.

Personal life
Devin Jr. was also a first-round draft pick in the 2019 NFL Draft to the Pittsburgh Steelers. The Bush family joined (among others) the Mannings (Eli Manning, Peyton Manning, Arch Manning), the Humphreys (Bobby Humphrey, Marlon Humphrey) and the Matthews (Clay Matthews Sr., Bruce Matthews, Clay Matthews Jr., Casey Matthews, Clay Matthews III, Kevin Matthews, and Jake Matthews) as families with multiple members in the National Football League.

NFL stats

Key
 GP: games played
 COMB: combined tackles
 TOTAL: total tackles
 AST: assisted tackles
 SACK: sacks
 FF: forced fumbles
 FR: fumble recoveries
 FR YDS: fumble return yards 
 INT: interceptions
 IR YDS: interception return yards
 AVG IR: average interception return
 LNG: longest interception return
 TD: interceptions returned for touchdown
 PD: passes defended

References

1973 births
Living people
American football safeties
Atlanta Falcons players
Cleveland Browns players
Florida State Seminoles football players
St. Louis Rams players
High school football coaches in Florida
Hialeah Senior High School alumni
Players of American football from Miami
Sports coaches from Miami